Tropical Cyclone Willy may refer to:

Tropical Cyclone Willy (1984), in the 1983–84 Australian region cyclone season
Tropical Cyclone Willy (1994), in the 1993–94 Australian region cyclone season
Tropical Cyclone Willy (2005), in the 2004–05 Australian region cyclone season

Australian region cyclone set index articles